Chiloglanis elisabethianus is a species of upside-down catfish endemic to the Democratic Republic of the Congo where it occurs in the rivers of Katanga (province).  This species grows to a length of  TL.

References

External links 

elisabethianus
Freshwater fish of Africa
Fish of the Democratic Republic of the Congo
Endemic fauna of the Democratic Republic of the Congo
Taxa named by George Albert Boulenger
Fish described in 1915